The M1926 is a machine gun of Italian origin.

History
The Fabbrica Italiana Automobile Torino (Italian Torino car factory), one of Europe's biggest car industries, and it was in World War I one of Italy's main suppliers of ground-based and aviation machine guns, mostly of Revelli designs.

After World War, FIAT created in 1926 a subsidiary devoted exclusively to machine guns, that was the Societa Anonima Fabrica Armi Torino, or anonymous society Torino guns factory, mostly known as its abbreviated S.A.F.A.T designation.

The first aircraft machine gun produced by S.A.F.A.T was the M1928, a scaled-up variant of the M1926 with a belt feed and increased rate of fire. However, its main change was the adoption of the 8 mm Fiat cartridge instead the usual M1891 6.5 mm ammunition. Worth to mention that the "8mm FIAT" designation was in fact a fancy name for the 7.7x56R cartridge (.303 British). Both types were completely interchangeable.

The M1928 was installed in some biplane fighters of the late 1920s and early 1930s. It was proven unreliable as sometimes the case ruptured with remains left in the chamber and difficult to synchronize, so it was replaced by the better Breda SAFAT designs.

References

External links 
 La 12,7 Breda

Aircraft guns
Medium machine guns
Machine guns of Italy
Delayed blowback firearms
Firearms articles needing expert attention